Chrysops relictus, the twin-lobed deerfly, is a largish European and Asian deerfly of about  length, The larvae feed upon organic matter in damp soils, and are termed hydrobionts in that they inhabit areas of high water content.

References

Tabanidae
Diptera of Europe
Diptera of Asia
Insects described in 1820
Taxa named by Johann Wilhelm Meigen